The accessory visual structures (or adnexa of eye, ocular adnexa, etc.) are the protecting and supporting structures (adnexa) of the eye, including the eyebrow, eyelids, and lacrimal apparatus. The eyebrows, eyelids, eyelashes, lacrimal gland and drainage apparatus all play a crucial role with regards to globe protection, lubrication, and minimizing the risk of ocular infection. The adnexal structures also help to keep the cornea moist and clean. 

One source defines "ocular adnexa" as the orbit, conjunctiva, and eyelids. The orbit and extraocular muscles allow for the smooth movement of the eyeball.

Eyebrow

The eyebrow is an area of thick, short hairs above the eye. The main function is to prevent sweat, water, and other debris falling into the eye, but they are also important to human communication and facial expressions.

Eyelid

An eyelid is a thin fold of skin that covers and protects the eye. The levator palpebrae superioris muscle  helps in the movement of eyelid. The human eyelid features a row of eyelashes along the eyelid margin, which helps in protection of the eye from dust and foreign debris. The main function of eyelid is to keep the cornea moist and clean.

Conjunctiva

The conjunctiva is a tissue that lines the inside of the eyelids and covers the sclera. It is composed of unkeratinized, stratified squamous epithelium with goblet cells, and stratified columnar epithelium. The conjunctiva is basically transparent, and the white colour we see is actually sclera.

Lacrimal apparatus

The lacrimal apparatus is the physiological system containing the orbital structures for tear production and drainage. It consists of:
 The lacrimal gland, which secretes the tears, and its excretory ducts, which convey the fluid to the surface of the human eye; it is a serous gland located in lacrimal fossa. It is a j-shaped gland;
 The lacrimal canaliculi, the lacrimal sac, and the nasolacrimal duct, by which the fluid is conveyed into the cavity of the nose, emptying anterioinferiorly to the inferior nasal conchae from the nasolacrimal duct;
 The innervation of the lacrimal apparatus involves both the a sympathetic supply through the  carotid plexus of nerves around the internal carotid artery, and parasympathetically from the lacrimal nucleus of the facial nerve.

The orbit

The orbit is the cavity or socket of the skull in which the eye and its appendages are situated. The orbit helps in smooth rotation of the eyeball.

References

Human eye anatomy